The Răstolț is a right tributary of the river Agrij in Romania. It flows into the Agrij near Românași.

References

Rivers of Romania
Rivers of Sălaj County